An archiater was a chief physician of a monarch, who typically retained several. At the Roman imperial court, their chief held the high rank and specific title of Comes archiatrorum.

The term has also been used of chief physicians in communities.

In Finland  is the highest honorary title awarded to a physician by the President of Finland, such that there is only one archiater at a time. The most famous archiater in Finland has been Arvo Ylppö, who pioneered pediatrics in the country and is credited for the enormous reduction of infant mortality to the modern, very low levels.

In neighbouring Sweden, the title of archiater was bestowed on the great botanist Carl Linnaeus as an honour.

In Vatican City, the Pope's personal physician retains the historical title of archiater.

See also 

 City physician – historical city-appointed physician

References

 

Court titles
Ancient Roman physicians
Ancient Greek physicians
Professional titles and certifications
Court physicians